Mount Perez is a mountain (1,610 m) at the south side of the upper reaches of Suvorov Glacier, 6 nautical miles (11 km) southwest of Hornblende Bluffs, in the Wilson Hills. Named by Advisory Committee on Antarctic Names (US-ACAN) for Manuel J. Perez, Photographer's Mate, U.S. Navy member of the United States Geological Survey (USGS) Topo West survey party that established geodetic control for features between Cape Adare and the Wilson Hills during 1962–63.

Mountains of Oates Land